Dufour Yachts is a French sailboat manufacturer which was founded in 1964 by naval architect and engineer Michel Dufour.

It was purchased by Fountaine Pajot in 2018, and Dufour remains a separate brand.

Current models 
From the list of models on Dufour Yachts's website, as of February 2021.

 Dufour 310
 Dufour 360
 Dufour 390
 Dufour 412
 Dufour 430
 Dufour 470
 Dufour 530
 Dufour 56
 Dufour 61

Earlier models 
 Dufour Arpege
 Dufour T6
 Dufour T7
 Dufour Sortilege 41
 Dufour Sylphe
 Dufour 1200
 Dufour 1800
 Dufour 2800
 Dufour 12000
 Dufour 3800
 Dufour 4800
 Dufour 24
 Dufour 25
 Dufour 27
 Dufour 29
 Dufour 31
 Dufour 34
 Dufour 35
 Dufour 34 Performance
 Dufour 39 German Frers
 Dufour 40e
 Dufour 44 Performance
 Dufour 45e
 Dufour Classic 30
 Dufour Classic 32
 Dufour Classic 35
 Dufour Classic 36
 Dufour Classic 38
 Dufour Classic 41
 Dufour Classic 43
 Dufour Classic 45
 Dufour Classic 50
 Dufour 40 Performance
 Dufour 34e
 Dufour 325 Grand Large
 Dufour 335 Grand Large
 Dufour 365 Grand Large
 Dufour 36 Performance
 Dufour 375 Grand Large
 Dufour 380 Grand Large
 Dufour 385 Grand Large
 Dufour 405 Grand Large
 Dufour 410 Grand Large
 Dufour 445 Grand Large
 Dufour 450 Grand Large
 Dufour 425 Grand Large
 Dufour 455 Grand Large
 Dufour 485 Grand Large
 Dufour 500 Grand Large
 Dufour 512 Grand Large
 Dufour 525 Grand Large
 Dufour 560 Grand Large
Dufour 382 Grand Large
Dufour 460 Grand Large
Dufour 520 Grand Large
Dufour 63 Exclusive

References

External links

Dufour Yachts
French companies established in 1884